Yuliya Serhiyivna Sokolovska (born 12 April 1985) is a Ukrainian activist, civil servant and politician who is since 12 March 2020 Deputy Head of the Office of the President of Ukraine responsible for social affairs.

On 29 August 2019 Sokolovska was appointed as the Minister of Social Policy of Ukraine. In the 4 March 2020 appointed Shmyhal Government she did not return.

Biography 
Sokolovska studied at the Kyiv National Economic University (2007). She also graduated from the National Academy of State Administration (2016).

In 2007 Sokolovska started a career in the private sector.

In 2009 Sokolovska started working at the Kyiv City State Administration.

From 2014 to 2015, Sokolovska headed the Document Management Department of the Ministry of Economic Development and Trade. From 2015 to 2016, she served as Director of the Department of Social Budget Expenditures in the Ministry of Finance. From 2016 to 2017, she headed the Department of Strategic Planning and Coordination of State Policy of the Secretariat of Cabinet of Ministers.

On 29 August 2019 Sokolovska was appointed as the Minister of Social Policy of Ukraine in the Honcharuk Government. When this Government fell and was replaced on 4 March 2020 with  the Shmyhal Government she did not hold her post in the new Government.

On 12 March 2020 Sokolovska was appointed Deputy Head of the Office of the President of Ukraine (of President Volodymyr Zelensky) responsible for social affairs.

See also 
 Honcharuk Government

References

External links 
 
 Ministry of Social Policy (in Ukrainian)

1985 births
Living people
Kyiv National Economic University alumni
National Academy of State Administration alumni
Ukrainian women activists
Ukrainian civil servants
Labor and social policy ministers of Ukraine
Independent politicians in Ukraine
Women government ministers of Ukraine
21st-century Ukrainian women politicians
21st-century Ukrainian politicians
Recipients of the Honorary Diploma of the Cabinet of Ministers of Ukraine